Apple Daily was a Hong Kong newspaper.

2020

Human Rights Press Awards

SOPA Awards

2019

Human Rights Press Awards

SOPA Awards

2015

Human Rights Press Awards

SOPA

2014

2014 Human Rights Press Awards

2013

2013 Human Rights Press Awards

2012

2012 Human Rights Press Awards

2011

2011 Human Rights Press Awards

2010

2010 Human Rights Press Awards

2009

2009 Human Rights Press Awards

2008

2008 Human Rights Press Awards

2006

2006 Human Rights Press Awards

2005

2005 Human Rights Press Awards

2004

Human Rights Press Awards

The Newspaper Society of Hong Kong "Best Hong Kong News Reporting 2004"

2003

2003 Human Rights Press Awards

2002

Human Rights Press Awards

The Newspaper Society of Hong Kong "Best Hong Kong News Reporting"

2000

2000 Human Rights Press Awards

1999

1999 Human Rights Press Awards

1998

Asian Newspaper Awards 
These awards were announced at the Asian Newspaper Publishers' Expo (ANPE) and International Association for Newspaper and Media Technology (IFRA) annual conference in Kuala Lumpur on 30 March 1998. Apple Daily was named "Asian Newspaper of the Year".

References 

Journalism lists